On the Go is a 1925 American silent Western film directed by Richard Thorpe and starring Jay Wilsey, Helen Foster and Nelson McDowell.

Cast
 Jay Wilsey as Bill Drake 
 Helen Foster as Nell Hall
 Lafe McKee as Mr. Hall
 Nelson McDowell as Philip Graves
 Raye Hampton as Matilda Graves
 Slim Whitaker as Tom Evans 
 Louis Fitzroy as Mr. Evans
 George F. Marion as Eb Moots
 Alfred Hewston as Snoopy O'Sullivan
 Morgan Davis as Sheriff
 Pietro Sosso as City specialist

References

Bibliography
 Connelly, Robert B. The Silents: Silent Feature Films, 1910-36, Volume 40, Issue 2. December Press, 1998.
 Munden, Kenneth White. The American Film Institute Catalog of Motion Pictures Produced in the United States, Part 1. University of California Press, 1997.

External links
 

1925 films
1925 Western (genre) films
1920s English-language films
American silent feature films
Silent American Western (genre) films
American black-and-white films
Films directed by Richard Thorpe
1920s American films